WBGE (101.9 FM) is a Hot AC formatted radio station in the Tallahassee, Florida, market owned by Flint Media. While the biggest nearby market is in Florida, the station is actually the biggest station in all of Bainbridge, Georgia.

References

BGE